Nong Ya Plong is a district (amphoe) in the northwestern part of Phetchaburi province, western Thailand.

History
Nong Ya Plong was established as a minor district (king amphoe) on 16 July 1972, when three tambons, Nong Ya Plong, Yang Nam Klat Nuea, and Yang Nam Klat Tai were split off from Khao Yoi district. It was upgraded to a full district on 21 May 1990.

Geography
Neighboring districts are (from the north clockwise) Ban Kha and Pak Tho of Ratchaburi province, Khao Yoi, Ban Lat, and Kaeng Krachan of Phetchaburi Province. To the west is the Tanintharyi Division of Myanmar.

Administration
The district is divided into four sub-districts (tambons), which are further subdivided into 31 villages (mubans). There are no municipal areas (thesaban), and three tambon administrative organizations (TAO).

References

External links
amphoe.com

Nong Ya Plong